Sollentuna Köping was a köping in Sollentuna Hundred. In 1971, it was reformed into Sollentuna Municipality.

Köpings of Sweden